Philippa Whitford (born 24 December 1958) is a Scottish National Party (SNP) politician and a breast surgeon. She was first elected as the Member of Parliament (MP) for Central Ayrshire in May 2015 and was re-elected in 2017 and 2019. She has been serving as the SNP Spokesperson for Scotland since December 2022.

She served as the SNP Health spokesperson in the House of Commons from 2015 to 2021.

Early life and education
Whitford was born in Belfast, Northern Ireland to Elizabeth and Philip Whitford. The family moved to Scotland when she was aged ten. She was educated at Wood Green: St Angela's Providence Convent Secondary School in London and Douglas Academy in Milngavie, before studying at the University of Glasgow, where she graduated with medical degrees. She was the first woman in her family to gain admission to university.

Career

Surgical career
Whitford worked as a consultant breast surgeon at Crosshouse Hospital for more than 18 years.

Just after the First Gulf War and during the First Palestinian Intifada at the age of thirty, Whitford served for a year and a half as a medical volunteer in a United Nations hospital in the Gaza Strip. She spent the 2016 parliamentary recess travelling to the West Bank to operate on four women suffering from breast cancer, and visited Gaza to advise local hospitals on how to improve healthcare.

Political career
Whitford joined the Scottish National Party in 2012. She became involved with the campaign preceding the 2014 Scottish independence referendum. She advocated independence as a way of protecting NHS Scotland from the same kind of "creeping privatisation agenda undermining services in England". An online video of her claiming the NHS in England would be privatised within five years and in Scotland within ten went viral at this time.

“In five years, England will not have an NHS and in 10 years, if we vote no, neither will we," she said.

House of Commons
Whitford was selected to contest Central Ayrshire for the SNP at the 2015 general election. She polled 26,999 votes – 53.2% of the vote – defeating the incumbent Labour MP, Brian Donohoe, by 13,589 votes. She made her maiden speech in the House of Commons on 2 June 2015.

She was a member of the Joint Committee on the Draft Domestic Abuse Bill, but left the committee on 11 March 2019 to be replaced by Liz Saville Roberts.

In August 2020 after the SNP's rules on candidate selection were changed, meaning MPs seeking election to Holyrood would have to resign their seat at Westminster, Whitford tweeted "For ALL [SNP] MPs - now trapped at Westminster with no straightforward way to put themselves forward for Scotland’s own Parliament. No one ever mentioned this before any of us stood for Westminster." The tweet provoked an angry response from political opponents, with Labour's Monica Lennon responding that, "Representing your community is a privilege and responsibility like no other... If SNP MPs feel 'trapped' they should release themselves and let others serve."

In March 2021 Whitford compared Scotland's position as part of the United Kingdom to a woman "locked" in a room and who had had her cheque book “taken away”. The remarks were condemned as "appalling" by Scottish Labour's Deputy leader Jackie Baillie who said: "There is a constant challenge to ensure that domestic abuse is taken seriously and for the gravity of such offences to be properly recognised, so no one, let alone an MP, should ever trivialise the matter by making such throw away comments which will have deeply offended people."

After Westminster blocked the Gender Recognition Reform (Scotland) Bill in January 2023, using section 35 for the first time since the Scotland Act 1998 was passed, Whitford remarked that its veto was an “unprecedented attack” on the Scottish Parliament which showed the “hollow reality” of devolution in the United Kingdom”.

Personal life
Whitford has been married to Hans Pieper, a German citizen who works as a general practitioner, since 1987; the couple have a son together.

Titles
Dr Philippa Whitford
Dr Philippa Whitford MP (2015–present)

References

External links

 personal website
biography on UK Parliament
profile on SNP website

1958 births
Alumni of the University of Glasgow
Female members of the Parliament of the United Kingdom for Scottish constituencies
Living people
Members of the Parliament of the United Kingdom for Scottish constituencies
Scottish National Party MPs
Scottish surgeons
UK MPs 2015–2017
UK MPs 2017–2019
UK MPs 2019–present
21st-century Scottish women politicians
21st-century Scottish politicians
Scottish women medical doctors
People educated at Douglas Academy
Women surgeons